The Missouri State Bears and Lady Bears are the athletic teams representing Missouri State University (formerly Southwest Missouri State University). Missouri State's athletics programs date back to 1908. Missouri State competes in the NCAA Division I Football Championship Subdivision. The majority of sports play in the Division I Missouri Valley Conference. Missouri State football competes in the Missouri Valley Football Conference, while Men's Swimming and Diving competes in the Mid-American Conference, and the beach volleyball team is a member of the Coastal Collegiate Sports Association. Missouri State athletics are frequently abbreviated as "MOST" when televised.

Sports sponsored 

A member of the Missouri Valley Conference, Missouri State University sponsors six men's and 11 women's teams in NCAA sanctioned sports.

National championships

Team

Women's basketball NCAA tournament results

NCAA Tournament appearances

WNIT appearances
2002, 2005 (Champions), 2010, 2011, 2012, 2015, 2017, 2018

AIAW tournament appearances

Missouri AIAW state tournament: 1970–1982 (won 1971, 1973, 1974, 1975 and 1981 tournaments)
AIAW Region VI tournament: 1974, 1975, 1981
AIAW Division II national tournament: 1981

Conference championships

Gateway Conference (1983–1992) 2 
1991, 1992

Missouri Valley Conference (1992–present) 12 
1993, 1994, 1995, 1996, 1999, 2001, 2003, 2004, 2005, 2012, 2020, 2021

Head coaches
Reba Sims (10 seasons, 129–116), 1969–1979
Marti Gasser (4 seasons, 62–60), 1979–1983
Valerie Goodwin-Colbert (4 seasons, 48–63), 1983–1987
Cheryl Burnett (15 seasons, 319–136), 1987–2002
10 NCAA Tournament Appearances
2 Final Four Appearances
3 Sweet 16 Appearances
1 WNIT Appearance
Katie Abrahamson-Henderson (5 seasons, 95–61), 2002–2007
3 NCAA Tournament Appearances
WNIT Championship
Nyla Milleson (5 seasons, 105–87), 2007–2013
3 WNIT Appearances
Kellie Harper (6 seasons, 118–79), 2013–2019
2 NCAA Appearances
3 WNIT Appearances
Amaka Agugua-Hamilton (2 season, 49-7), 2019–present  
1 NCAA Appearance
1 Sweet Sixteen Appearance

Retired numbers
10 Jackie Stiles, 1997–2001  (NCAA Division I Women's Basketball's all-time #2 leading scorer with 3,393 points)
35 Melody Howard, 1990–1994
42 Jeanette Tendai, 1982–1986

Facilities

Club sports
The university also sponsors several club sports teams, including ice hockey (ACHA), lacrosse (MCLA), and roller hockey (NCRHA).

Men's ice hockey

Missouri State men's ice hockey, known as the Ice Bears, began in 2001 and despite not being a varsity NCAA sport receives much attention on and off-campus. The Ice Bears currently compete at the Division I level of the American Collegiate Hockey Association (ACHA) in the Western Collegiate Hockey League (WCHL). The teams play off-campus at the 2,000-seat Mediacom Ice Park.

Men's varsity ice hockey finished the 2009–2010 season ranked 2nd in the MACHA DII with a record of 12–4–0 in 16 league games, the team lost in the MACHA Championship 1–5 to Southern Illinois University- Edwardsville.  In addition to the ACHA DII team the University also fields a JV teams playing at the ACHA DIII level. The team won the MACHA DIII championship with a 5–3 win over Robert Morris University- Peoria.

Men's lacrosse
Missouri State also fields a highly successful club Lacrosse Team. Founded in 2003, it competes in the Men's Collegiate Lacrosse Association (MCLA) Division II and was a member of the Great Rivers Lacrosse Conference (GRLC) through 2017 before it moved to Division II of the Lone Star Alliance (LSA) in 2018. The Bears have been conference champions five times in their history (2004, 2009, 2010, 2017, and 2018) and have qualified for the MCLA National Championships on four occasions (2009, 2010, 2017, and 2018). The Bears finished the 2018 season with a record of 12-3, including a perfect 6-0 conference record and victories over Creighton, Baylor, and in-state rival University of Missouri. Since 2003, Missouri State has fielded 11 All-Americans, over 80 All-Conference players, 3 GRLC Tournament MVP's, and 4 GRLC Division II Coach's of the Year.

References

External links